The 2019 WAFU Cup of Nations was the sixth edition of the WAFU Nations Cup, an association football tournament that is affiliated with the West African Football Union (WAFU). It took place from 28 September to 13 October 2019 in Thiès, Senegal. The tournament was sponsored by most notably ESPN and Royal Air Morac.

All sixteen members of WAFU competed in the competition in a knockout-style format with the losers of the first round playing in a plate-competition. 

Senegal won the tournament after beating defending champions Ghana in the final via a penalty shoot-out.

Sponsorship 
The competition was sponsored by ESPN with Royal Air Maroc being the exclusive airline sponsor. The tournament was telecast on all ESPN platforms.

Draw
The draw took place on 29 May 2019 at Radisson Blu Sea Plaza Hotel in Dakar.

Officials 

Referees
   Hassan Corneh (Liberia)
   Dahane Beida (Mauritania)
   Bangaly Konate (Guinea)
   Salisu Basheer (Nigeria)
   Fabricio Duarte (Cape Verde)
   Omar Sallah (Gambia)
   Adaari Abdul Latif (Ghana)
   Daouda Gueye (Senegal)
   Mohamed Ali Moussa (Niger)
   (Ms) Vincentia Amedome (Togo)
   Boubou Traoré  (Mali)
   Bonifacio Julio da Silva (Guinea-Bissau)
   Allou Franc Eric Miessan (Ivory Coast)
   Boureima Sanogo (Burkina Faso)
   Louis Houngnandande (Benin)

Assistant Referees
   Sekou S. Kanneh Jr (Liberia)
   Mohamed Mahmoud Youssouf (Mauritania)
   Mamady Tere (Guinea)
   Peter Eigege Ogwu (Nigeria)
   (Ms) Mimisen Iyorhe (Nigeria)
   Essawa Sowe (Gambia)
   Noha Bangoura (Senegal)
   Abdoul Aziz Yacouba (Niger)
   (Ms) Adia Cissé (Senegal)
   Komlan Domenyo Adiwotso (Togo)
   Baba Yomboliba  (Mali)
   Adou Hermann N'Goh (Ivory Coast)
   Habib Judicael Sanou (Burkina Faso)
   Aymar Eric Ayimavo (Benin)

Matches 
The match winners qualified for the cup competition, with the losing teams qualifying for the plate competition.

Plate competition

Quarter-finals

Semi-finals

Final

Cup competition

Quarter-finals

Semi-finals

Final

Champion

WAFU Team of the Tournament 
Source:

Coach:  Maxwelll Konadu

Individual awards 
The following awards were given at the conclusion of the tournament.

 Top scorer

  Shafiu Mumuni (4 goals)

 Golden Glove

  Alpha Jalloh

 Coach of the Tournament

  Maxwelll Konadu

References

External links 

 ALL ON THE WAFU CUP OF NATIONS- Senegal 2019
Senegal beats defending champions Ghana to lift 1st WAFU title | 2019 WAFU Cup of Nations

WAFU Nations Cup
2019 in African football
2019
September 2019 sports events in Africa
October 2019 sports events in Africa